The Cassette Scandal (Russian:  Кассетный скандал, also known as Tapegate or Kuchmagate) was a Ukrainian political scandal in November 2000 in which Ukrainian president Leonid Kuchma was caught on tape ordering the months-earlier kidnapping of journalist Georgiy Gongadze, whose decapitated corpse had recently been found. The scandal was one of the main political events in Ukraine's post-independence history, dramatically affecting the country's domestic and foreign policy. The scandal, triggering the Ukraine Without Kuchma protests, also began a slow and gradual shift of Ukraine's political and cultural orientation from Russia towards the West, although this only became more pronounced after Euromaidan in 2013-2014. The scandal also damaged Kuchma's political career.

The scandal started on 28November 2000, in Kyiv, when Ukrainian politician Oleksandr Moroz publicly accused President Kuchma of involvement in the abduction of journalist Georgiy Gongadze and numerous other crimes. Moroz named Kuchma's former bodyguard, Mykola Melnychenko, as the source. He also played selected recordings of the President's secret conversations for journalists, supposedly confirming Kuchma's order to kidnap Gongadze. That and hundreds of other conversations were later published worldwide by Melnychenko.

Journalists nicknamed the case after the compact audio cassette used by Moroz. Melnychenko himself was supposedly using digital equipment, not cassettes, for recording in the president's office.

Consequences

The described events provoked a crisis, with mass protests in Kyiv from 15 December 2000 to 9 March 2001. Opposition started a campaign of non-violent resistance called UBK ("Ukraine without Kuchma"), demanding Kuchma's resignation.  Despite economic growth in the country, President Kuchma's public approval ratings fell below 9%.

In 2002, the governments of United States and other countries became more deeply involved after one of the recordings revealed the alleged transfer of a sophisticated Ukrainian defence system Kolchuga to Saddam Hussein's Iraq. As a result, Leonid Kuchma was boycotted by Western governments for a time. In particular, he experienced an offensive diplomatic démarche when visiting the North Atlantic Treaty Organization summit that took place on 21–22 November 2002 in Prague. Breaking the decades-lasting tradition, the list of participating countries was announced in French, not English. As a result Turkey was named after Ukraine, instead of the United Kingdom and United States, thereby avoiding the appearance of Kuchma next to Tony Blair and George W. Bush.

Moreover, widely publicized conversations depicted Kuchma as a rude and spiteful person, using profanity and speaking Surzhyk, a mixture of Russian and Ukrainian languages. Advocates argue that excessive foul language is the proof of a deliberate montage of the recordings using extrinsic audio samples. However, the United States ambassador to Ukraine, Carlos Pascual, said that the tapes are genuine, undistorted, unaltered, and not manipulated because of the conclusion from FBI Electronic Research Facility's analysis of the original recording device and the original recording found that there are not unusual sounds which would indicate a tampering of the recording, the recording is continuous with no breaks, and there is no manipulation of the digital files.

Influenced by all above-mentioned, the president soon became disillusioned with European integration and started to loosen Ukraine's relations with the United States and European Union, critical to his regime. Instead, he boosted integration with Russia, considering the fact that its new leader, Vladimir Putin, was continuously supporting Kuchma and refusing to recognize the allegations.

In September 2003, Ukrainian troops joined U.S.-led stabilization forces in Iraq, which is widely perceived as Kuchma's effort to improve relations with the West. Since then, high-level relations were partially restored.

Commenting on the scandal and Melnychenko's actions in particular, Leonid Kuchma persistently claims they were a result of foreign interference, but never accuses any specific country. However, some of his statements on the issue may be interpreted as cautious hints on the role of either United States or Russia. According to him his voice was indeed one of those on the tapes, but he claimed that they had been selectively edited to distort his meaning.

Legacy
Many figures of the scandal remained influential in Ukrainian politics. The case was directly connected with the political career of Viktor Yushchenko, Ukraine's prime minister at the time. Oleksander Moroz concluded an alliance with Yushchenko, resulting in the reformation of Ukraine's constitution (in favor of the parliament). Hundreds of politicians and activists taking part in the 2001 protests led the 2004 Orange Revolution. Yushchenko led the revolution after the presidential election, and became president on 23 January 2005.

Mykola Melnychenko (who received U.S. political asylum) released new portions of his recordings. In 2004, Volodymyr Tsvil, a Ukrainian businessman who assisted Melnychenko in his escape, publicly accused him of not revealing certain details of the case and trying to sell the audio archive to Kuchma's aides. Melnychenko visited Ukraine in 2005 to release new allegation details, but has not disclosed any details of his possible eavesdropping operation.

The criminal investigation regarding the circumstances of Melnychenko's records and Georgiy Gongadze's death remains inconclusive despite a mass of information revealed by numerous journalistic investigations.

Melnychenko's recordings were declared evidence when Kuchma was charged with abuse of office and giving illegal orders to Interior Ministry officials; a criminal case into the murder of Gongadze was opened against Kuchma on 21 March 2011. A Ukrainian district court ordered prosecutors to drop criminal charges against Kuchma on 14 December 2011 on grounds that evidence linking him to the murder of Gongadze was insufficient. The court rejected Melnychenko's recordings as evidence.

See also
Myroslava Gongadze, widow of Georgiy Gongadze.
Orange Revolution
Ukrayinska Pravda, newspaper founded by Gongadze
Mykola Melnychenko, bodyguard of the former Ukrainian President Leonid Kuchma.
Politics of Ukraine
History of Ukraine

References

Further reading

slate.com - Article on Gongadze scandal
REQUIEM'2002 - Article by Reporters Sans Frontières
Guardian Unlimited -  Kuchmagate

2000 in Ukraine
History of Ukraine since 1991
Political scandals in Ukraine
Ukrayinska Pravda
Leonid Kuchma
2000 scandals
November 2000 events in Ukraine